The South Korea women's national short track team represents South Korea in international short track speed skating team relay competitions like the World Championships and the Winter Olympics.

3000 metre relay Olympic record

See also
 South Korea national short track team

References

Korea, South
Short track

ko: 대한민국 쇼트트랙 스피드 스케이팅 국가대표팀